Giorgia Bordignon (born 24 May 1987) is an Italian weightlifter. She  competed at the 2020 Summer Olympics in Tokyo, and  won the silver medal in the women's 64 kg event.  She competed in the women's 63 kg event at the 2016 Summer Olympics.

References

External links
 

1987 births
Living people
Italian female weightlifters
Olympic weightlifters of Italy
Weightlifters at the 2016 Summer Olympics
Weightlifters of Fiamme Azzurre
People from Gallarate
Mediterranean Games silver medalists for Italy
Mediterranean Games medalists in weightlifting
Competitors at the 2018 Mediterranean Games
European Weightlifting Championships medalists
Weightlifters at the 2020 Summer Olympics
Medalists at the 2020 Summer Olympics
Olympic silver medalists for Italy
Olympic medalists in weightlifting
Sportspeople from the Province of Varese
21st-century Italian women